Colonnade Falls ht. upper , ht. lower  is a set of two waterfalls on the Bechler River in Yellowstone National Park.  Colonnade Falls is accessible via the Bechler River Trail.  The falls were named in 1885 by members of the Arnold Hague Geological Survey probably because the falls resemble a row of columns at regular intervals.

See also
 Waterfalls in Yellowstone National Park

Notes

Waterfalls of Yellowstone National Park
Waterfalls of Wyoming
Waterfalls of Teton County, Wyoming